Seven Sinners can refer to:

 Seven Sinners (1925 film), an early film by Lewis Milestone
 Seven Sinners (1936 film), a British thriller
 Seven Sinners (1940 film), starring Marlene Dietrich and John Wayne
 7 Sinners, an album by Helloween